Canuto Borelli (January 19, 1852 – 1928) was an Italian lawyer and painter, mainly of landscapes and portraits.

Biography
He was a pupil of Enrico Gamba and Antonio Fontanesi at the Albertina Academy. He became director of the Institute of Art and Crafts of Asti. He was an active member and supporter of the cultural scene in the Piedmont,  and one of his pupils was Ottavio Baussano.

References

19th-century Italian painters
Italian male painters
20th-century Italian painters
20th-century Italian male artists
1852 births
1928 deaths
Painters from Piedmont
Italian landscape painters
Accademia Albertina alumni
19th-century Italian male artists